Omid Nouripour (born 18 June 1975) is a German-Iranian politician of the Alliance '90/The Greens who has been serving as a member of the Bundestag since 2006, representing the state of Hesse. Since 2022, he has also been serving as co-leader of Alliance 90/The Greens, alongside Ricarda Lang.

Earlier in his career, Nouripour was his parliamentary group's spokesman on foreign affairs, and is a member of the Committee on Foreign Affairs and the Finance Committee. He is of Iranian background and moved to Germany as a child.

Early life and education
Nouripour was born in Tehran. In 1988, aged 13, Nouripour immigrated to Frankfurt, West Germany, with his family. He studied German, political science, law, sociology, philosophy and economics at the University of Mainz, but did not earn a degree.

In 2002, Nouripour became a German citizen. Because Iran does not allow its citizens to relinquish their citizenship, that country considers him an Iranian citizen as well.

Political career
Nouripour was elected to the German Federal Parliament in 2006 as the second member of Iranian descent (after Michaela Noll-Tadjadod), taking the vacated seat of the former Foreign Minister Joschka Fischer. He has since been representing the Frankfurt am Main II district and was re-elected in 2009, 2013, 2017 and 2021.

Between 2006 and 2013, Nouripour was a member of the Defence Committee and the Budget Committee, where he served as his parliamentary group's rapporteur on the annual budgets of the Federal Foreign Office (AA), the Federal Ministry of the Interior (BMI), the Federal Ministry of Health (BMG), the Federal Court of Auditors (BRH) and the Office of the Federal President.

Nouripour was a member of the Committee on Foreign Affairs from 2014 to 2022 and of the Finance Committee from 2021 to 2022. He also served on the Committee on Human Rights and Humanitarian Aid from 2014 until 2017. He has written widely on migration and is the speaker of the Green Party on migration issues and refugees.

In July 2015, Nouripour joined Germany’s Foreign Minister Frank-Walter Steinmeier on a trip to Cuba. It was the first time a German foreign minister had visited Cuba since the German reunification in 1990.

In addition to his committee assignments, Nouripour has been chairman of the German-Ukrainian Parliamentary Friendship Group since 2018. Already since 2014, he has also been serving as deputy chairman of the German-US Parliamentary Friendship Group and the German-Indian Parliamentary Friendship Group.

In the negotiations to form a so-called traffic light coalition of the Social Democrats (SPD), the Green Party and the FDP following the 2021 federal elections, Nouripour led his party's delegation in the working group on foreign policy, defence, development cooperation and human rights; his co-chairs from the other parties were Heiko Maas and Alexander Graf Lambsdorff.

Political positions

Military procurement
In 2011, Nouripour accused the aerospace company EADS of strong-arming European governments into agreeing to fund the Airbus A400M Atlas by falsely suggesting the Franco-German-led company might otherwise collapse.

Relations with the Middle East and the Arab world
Speaking on the 2012 Bahraini uprising, Nouripour commented that "[a]s the kingdom of Saudi Arabia is supporting the state-repression inside Bahrain, Iran acts as the protector of the Shia."

In a study sent to the German foreign minister Guido Westerwelle in May 2012, Nouripour and Hans-Josef Fell proposed that Germany should help Iran expand renewable energy sources to solve the conflict over the nation’s nuclear program and prevent a war in the region. Under the umbrella of the German parliaments’ sponsorship program for human rights activists, Nouripour has been raising awareness for the work of the persecuted Iranian lawyer Nasrin Sotoudeh since 2012.

When Turkey formally asked NATO in November 2012 to set up missiles on its border with Syria due to growing concern about spillover from the civil war, Nouripour warned against Germany and NATO "letting themselves be drawn into the Syria conflict with no basis in international law." However, he later voted for posting two German Patriot missile batteries to help bolster security along Turkey's border with Syria in the context of the NATO-backed operation Active Fence in 2015.

For years Nouripour opposed listing the Lebanese militant group Hezbollah as a terrorist organization. However, after the 2012 Burgas bus bombing, he stated that “it’s now time to isolate Hezbollah.”

In May 2014 and February 2016, Nouripour visited the Zaatari refugee camp in Jordan to learn more about the plight of Syrians fleeing the violence in the Syrian civil war that had been going on since 2011.

Until 2020, Nouripour sat on the advisory board of the German Palestinian Society (Deutsch-Palästinensische Gesellschaft), which supports the Boycott, Divestment and Sanctions movement (BDS), which was designated as anti-semitic by the German Bundestag in May 2019. In the 2019 parliamentary debate on BDS, Nouripour criticised BDS actions like the call for a boycott of the 2019 Eurovision Song Contest in Tel Aviv.

In 2013 Nouripour co-sponsored an initiative at the German Bundestag aimed at singling out products from Israeli settlements in the West Bank with a labeling system.

Relations with the African continent
Nouripour has in the past voted in favor of German participation in United Nations peacekeeping missions as well as in United Nations-mandated European Union peacekeeping missions on the African continent, as for example in Darfur, Sudan (2010, 2011, 2012, 2014, 2015, 2016 and 2018), South Sudan (2011, 2012, 2014, 2015, 2016 and 2018), Mali (2013, 2014, 2015 and 2018), the Central African Republic (2014), and Liberia (2015).

On Somalia, Nouripour has a mixed voting record. He has supported Operation Atalanta (2009, 2010, 2011 and 2018) but for a period of time regularly abstained from votes on extending the mandate for the mission (2012, 2013, 2014 and 2015). He also voted against German participation in EUTM Somalia (2014 and 2016), and abstained in 2015. After reports in 2010 that the German company Asgaard had signed a deal with a Somali warlord to provide security services, Nouripour accused the German government of not doing enough in the past to regulate private security firms.

Other activities
 Atlantik-Brücke, Member of the Board
 Berghof Foundation, Member of the Advisory Council
 European Council on Foreign Relations (ECFR), Member
 German Africa Foundation, Member of the Board
 German Association for Small and Medium-Sized Businesses (BVMW), Member of the Political Advisory Board (since 2022)
 German Institute for International and Security Affairs (SWP), Member of the Council
 Inter-Parliamentary Alliance on China (IPAC), Member
 World Vision Deutschland, Member of the Board of Trustees
 Center for International Peace Operations (ZIF), Member of the Supervisory Board (2009-2013)
 Das Progressive Zentrum, Member of the Circle of Friends (–2021)

References

External links

 A Persian succeeds Joschka Fischer in German parliament (BBC Persian)
 Biography
 Ein Makel im Lebenslauf: Deutsche Spitzenpolitiker verschleiern ihre Studienabbrüche

1975 births
Living people
Members of the Bundestag for Hesse
German Shia Muslims
Iranian Shia Muslims
German politicians of Iranian descent
Iranian emigrants to Germany
Naturalized citizens of Germany
Members of the Bundestag 2021–2025
Members of the Bundestag 2017–2021
Members of the Bundestag 2013–2017
Members of the Bundestag 2009–2013
Members of the Bundestag for Alliance 90/The Greens